List of Lithuanian diplomats includes Lithuanian diplomatic representatives – Chargés d'affaires ad interim (CDAI) and Envoys Extraordinary and Minister Plenipotentiary (Envoy) – of Lithuania in 1918–1940. The list does not include consuls. Some representatives continued after the Soviet occupation of Lithuania in June 1940 (see list of Lithuanian diplomats (1940–1990)).

List

References

Lithuania diplomacy-related lists
History of Lithuania (1918–1940)